The buildings at 1601–1830 St. Paul Street and 12–20 E. Lafayette Street form a national historic district in Baltimore, Maryland, United States. They are a distinctive collection of 76 residential rowhouses in north central Baltimore, most of which were constructed between 1876 and 1906.

It was added to the National Register of Historic Places in 1984.

References

External links
, including photo from 1997, at Maryland Historical Trust
Boundary Map of the 1601-1830 St. Paul Street and 12-20 East Lafayette Street Historic District, Baltimore City, at Maryland Historical Trust

Historic districts in Baltimore
Houses on the National Register of Historic Places in Baltimore
Historic districts on the National Register of Historic Places in Maryland
Midtown, Baltimore